Victoria Tower is the tallest tower of the Palace of Westminster in London, England.

Victoria Tower may also refer to:

 Victoria Tower (Adelaide), the clock tower on the Adelaide GPO
 Victoria Tower (Canada), former part of the Parliament Buildings in Ottawa
 Victoria Tower (Guernsey), an historic landmark in Guernsey
 Victoria Tower (Hong Kong), a historic building in Hong Kong
 Victoria Tower (Liverpool), a clock tower by Salisbury Dock in Liverpool, England
 Victoria Tower (Pakistan), in Jacobabad, Sindh, Pakistan
 Victoria Tower, part of the Municipal Buildings complex in Greenock, Scotland
 Victoria Tower, on Castle Hill, Huddersfield, West Yorkshire, England
 Victoria Towers, a large residential development in Hong Kong
 Victoria Tower (Stockholm), a hotel in Stockholm, the tallest in Northern Europe